Tian Xin (born 29 March 1998) is a Chinese footballer currently playing as a midfielder for Shandong Taishan.

Club career
Tian Xin was promoted to the senior team of Shandong Luneng within the 2018 Chinese Super League season, but he would have to wait until 9 March 2019 to make his debut, which was in a league game against Henan Jianye that ended in a 2-2 draw. This would be followed by his first goal for the club on 1 May 2019 in a Chinese FA Cup game against Zhejiang Energy Greentown F.C. that ended in a 2-1 victory.

Tian Xin would be used as a squad player within the team and would gain his first Chinese FA Cup by winning the 2020 Chinese FA Cup against Jiangsu Suning F.C. in a 2-0 victory. This would be followed by his first league title with the club when he was part of the team that won the 2021 Chinese Super League title. Another Chinese FA Cup would be followed up by him winning the 2022 Chinese FA Cup with them.

Career statistics

Honours

Club
Shandong Luneng/ Shandong Taishan
Chinese Super League: 2021.
Chinese FA Cup: 2020, 2021, 2022.

References

External links

1998 births
Living people
Chinese footballers
Association football midfielders
Chinese Super League players
Shandong Taishan F.C. players